The pallid Atlantic Forest rat (Delomys sublineatus) is a rodent species from South America. It is found in Brazil.

References

Delomys
Mammals of Brazil
Mammals described in 1903
Taxa named by Oldfield Thomas